Anthony William Currie (born 1 January 1950) is an English former footballer who had significant spells for Sheffield United, Leeds United and Queens Park Rangers as well as representing England.

He was an effervescent and exuberant attacking midfield player with the vision and ability to strike long dangerous passes. His nephew, Darren Currie, was also a midfielder.

Career
Currie was a talented schoolboy footballer who represented Hendon Boys before joining Queens Park Rangers as an amateur, whilst working for a building firm. He joined Chelsea as an apprentice, but was released and moved to Watford to complete his apprenticeship, earning England Youth honours in the process. He turned professional in May 1967 and made his league debut the following season.

He was transferred to Sheffield United on 1 February 1968 for £26,500. He scored on his debut against Tottenham Hotspur with a header on 26 February but missed the next game on 2 March as it was his wedding day. 'TC' or 'Top Cat' as he was nicknamed by Sheffield United fans, was idolised in his time at Bramall Lane. He went on to score 54 goals in 313 appearances and was also made captain by manager Ken Furphy in March 1974. In September 2014, as part of the club's 125th Anniversary celebrations, he was named Sheffield United's Greatest Ever Player 

In June 1976 he moved to Yorkshire rivals Leeds United for £250,000, making his Leeds debut in a 2–2 draw with West Bromwich Albion. His skills made him a firm favourite at Leeds, where he played a total of 124 games, scoring 16 goals. His curling shot during United's November 1978 4–0 home win against Southampton F.C. won ITV's The Big Match Goal of the Season that year. Currie's form helped Leeds reach the League Cup semi–finals in 1978 and 1979, and in the 1978–79 season Leeds finished fifth to qualify for the UEFA Cup. As his wife was homesick for London this resulted in his sale to Queens Park Rangers in August 1979.

Currie captained Rangers in the 1982 FA Cup Final replay, though he conceded the penalty from which Glenn Hoddle scored the winning goal. His career was badly affected by injuries and, after five goals in 81 games, he dropped out of league football and into semi-retirement from the game. He moved to Canada and spent two months playing for the Toronto Nationals, joining Chesham United on his return to Britain. He subsequently joined Southend United on non-contract terms before being persuaded by David Webb to join Torquay United in February 1984. He scored once in 16 games for the Gulls.

He moved to Tranmere Rovers in October 1984, but left without appearing in their first team, leaving him with 81 goals in 528 league games. He moved into non–league football, playing for Dunstable Town, Hendon and Goole Town before being appointed Football in the Community co-ordinator at Sheffield United in February 1988, a post he still holds today.

International career
During his time at Sheffield United, he broke into the England team, winning the first of his 17 caps in 1972. He was capped 11 times whilst at Leeds.

He played in the World Cup qualifier against Poland, which was held at Wembley Stadium in 1973. England dominated the match, but could only draw 1–1 and failed to qualify.

Career statistics

Club

References

Huntley, E.J. (2007). A Quality Player: The Life and Career of Tony Currie. Pickard Communications. .

External links
 Profile of Tony Currie

1950 births
Living people
People from Edgware
English footballers
England international footballers
England under-23 international footballers
Sheffield United F.C. players
Watford F.C. players
Leeds United F.C. players
Queens Park Rangers F.C. players
Southend United F.C. players
Torquay United F.C. players
Dunstable Town F.C. players
Hendon F.C. players
Goole Town F.C. players
Association football midfielders
English Football League players
Footballers from Edgware
English Football League representative players
Toronto Nationals (soccer) players
FA Cup Final players
Canadian Professional Soccer League (original) players